The ultraviolet radiation in sunlight has both positive and negative health effects, as it is required for the synthesis of vitamin D3 and is a mutagen. A dietary supplement can supply vitamin D without this mutagenic effect, but supplementation offers limited bioavailability and no synthesis of subdermal nitric oxide. Vitamin D has been suggested as having a wide range of positive health effects, which include strengthening bones and possibly inhibiting the growth of some cancers. UV exposure also has positive effects for endorphin levels, and possibly for protection against multiple sclerosis. Abundant visible light to the eyes gives health benefits through its association with the timing of melatonin synthesis, maintenance of normal and robust circadian rhythms, and reduced risk of seasonal affective disorder.

Long-term sunlight exposure is known to be associated with the development of some types of skin cancer, skin aging, immune suppression, eye diseases such as cataracts and maybe macular degeneration.  Conversely, long-term sun avoidance is associated with increased all-cause mortality and increased mortality risk from cardiovascular disease (CVD) and non-CVD/noncancer related disease.

Since UV rays, and therefore sunlight and sunlamps, are carcinogens that also have health benefits, a number of public health organizations state that there needs to be a balance between the risks of having too much sunlight or too little. There is a general consensus that sunburn should always be avoided.

Synthesis of vitamin D3 

 UVB radiation with a wavelength of 290–315 nanometers penetrates uncovered skin and converts cutaneous 7-dehydrocholesterol to previtamin D3, which in turn becomes vitamin D3. UVB radiation does not penetrate glass, so exposure to sunshine indoors through a window does not produce vitamin D. Time of day, time of year, geographic latitude, ground altitude, cloud cover, smog, skin melanin content, and sunscreen are among the factors that greatly affect UV intensity and vitamin D synthesis, making it difficult to provide general guidelines. It has been suggested by some researchers, for example, that adequate amounts of vitamin D can be produced with moderate sun exposure to the face, arms and legs, averaging 5–30 minutes twice per week without sunscreen. (The darker the complexion, or the weaker the sunlight, the more minutes of exposure are needed, approximating 25% of the time for minimal sunburn. Vitamin D overdose is impossible from UV exposure; the skin reaches an equilibrium where the vitamin degrades as fast as it is created.) Individuals with limited sun exposure need to include good sources of vitamin D in their diet or take a supplement.

The only way to quantify adequate levels of vitamin D is with a serum 25(OH)D3 (calcifediol) test. In the United States, serum 25(OH)D3 was below the recommended level for more than a third of white men in a 2005 study, with serum levels even lower in women and in most minorities. This indicates that vitamin D deficiency may be a common problem in the US. Australia and New Zealand have had similar findings, which indicate insufficient protection against rickets for children and osteoporosis for adults.

Over the past several years, levels of ultraviolet radiation have been tracked at over 30 sites across North America as part of the United States Department of Agriculture's UVB Monitoring and Research Program at Colorado State University.  The first map at right shows levels of UVB radiation in June 2008, expressed in Vitamin D Equivalents.

Using satellite data, measurements from the European Space Agency produce similar maps expressed in units of the widely followed UV Index, for locations around the world.   Effects of UV-radiation at high latitudes, where snow stays on the ground into early summer and the sun then remains at a low position even at its zenith, have been reviewed by Meyer-Rochow.

Exposure to ultraviolet radiation from the sun is a source of vitamin D. One minimal erythemal dose of sunlight UV radiation provides the equivalent of about 20,000 IU of vitamin D2, taken as an oral supplement. If an adult's arms and legs are exposed to a half minimal erythemal UV radiation, it is the same as taking 3,000 IU of vitamin D3 through an oral supplement. This exposure of 10–15 minutes, on a frequency of two to three times per week, will cause the adult's skin to produce enough vitamin D. It is not necessary to expose the face to the UV, as facial skin provides little vitamin D3. Individuals whose metabolism makes taking oral vitamin D ineffective are able, through exposure to an ultraviolet lamp that emits UV-B radiation, to achieve a 25 (OH) D blood level.

Three benefits of UV exposure are production of vitamin D, improvement in mood, and increased energy.

UVB induces production of vitamin D in the skin at rates of up to 1,000 IUs per minute. This vitamin helps to regulate calcium metabolism (vital for the nervous system and bone health), immunity, cell proliferation, insulin secretion, and blood pressure. In low and middle income countries, foods fortified with vitamin D are "practically nonexistent." Most people in the world depend on the sun to get vitamin D, and elderly populations in low UVB countries experience higher rates of cancer.

There are not many foods that naturally have vitamin D. Examples are cod liver oil and oily fish. If people cannot get sunlight, then they will need 1,000 IU of vitamin D per day to stay healthy. A person would have to eat oily fish three or four times per week in order to get enough vitamin D from that food source alone.

People with higher levels of vitamin D tend to have lower rates of diabetes, heart disease, and stroke and tend to have lower blood pressure. However, it has been found that vitamin D supplementation does not improve cardiovascular health or metabolism, so the link with vitamin D must be in part indirect. People who get more sun are generally healthier, and also have higher vitamin D levels. It has been found that ultraviolet radiation (even UVA) produces nitric oxide (NO) in the skin, and nitric oxide can lower blood pressure. High blood pressure increases the risk of stroke and heart disease. Although long-term exposure to ultraviolet contributes to non-melanoma skin cancers that are rarely fatal, it has been found in a Danish study that those who get these cancers were less likely to die during the study, and were much less likely to have a heart attack, than those who did not have these cancers.

People in certain situations, such as people with intellectual disabilities and neurodevelopmental disorders who stay inside most of the time have low vitamin D levels. Getting enough vitamin D can help stave off "autoimmune diseases, cardiovascular disease, many types of cancer, dementia, types 1 and 2 diabetes mellitus, and respiratory tract infections."

Fetuses and children who do not get enough vitamin D can result in "growth retardation and skeletal deformities."

Lower prevalence of multiple sclerosis 

Multiple sclerosis (MS) is least prevalent in the sunniest regions. Exposure to the ultraviolet-B radiation of sunlight appears to be most important and this may operate via vitamin D synthesis.

Risks to skin 

Ultraviolet (UV) irradiation present in sunlight is an environmental human carcinogen. The toxic effects of UV from natural sunlight and therapeutic artificial lamps are a major concern for human health. The major acute effects of UV irradiation on normal human skin comprise sunburn inflammation erythema, tanning, and local or systemic immunosuppression. The most deadly form, malignant melanoma, is mostly caused by indirect DNA damage from UVA radiation. This can be seen from the absence of a direct UV signature mutation in 92% of all melanoma. UVC is the highest-energy, most-dangerous type of ultraviolet radiation, and causes adverse effects that can variously be mutagenic or carcinogenic.

Despite the importance of the sun to vitamin D synthesis, it is prudent to limit the exposure of skin to UV radiation from sunlight and from tanning beds. According to the National Toxicology Program Report on Carcinogens from the US Department of Health and Human Services, broad-spectrum UV radiation is a carcinogen whose DNA damage is thought to contribute to most of the estimated 1.5 million skin cancers and the 8,000 deaths due to metastatic melanoma that occur annually in the United States. The use of sunbeds is reported by the World Health Organization to be responsible for over 450,000 cases of non-melanoma skin cancer and over 10,000 cases of melanoma every year in the U.S., Europe, as well as Australia. Lifetime cumulative UV exposure to skin is also responsible for significant age-associated dryness, wrinkling, elastin and collagen damage, freckling, IGH, age spots and other cosmetic changes. The American Academy of Dermatology advises that photoprotective measures be taken, including the use of sunscreen, whenever one is exposed to the sun. Short-term over-exposure causes the pain and itching of sunburn, which in extreme cases can produce more-severe effects like blistering.

Several countries (such as Australia) provide public forecasts of UV irradiation in the form of the UV Index. The index can be used as a guide to the public of dangers from over-exposure to sunlight, especially around noon, when direct sunlight is at its most intense.

Benefits of optic exposure 

Light to the eyes, primarily blue-wavelength light, is important for the entrainment and maintenance of robust circadian rhythms.  Exposure to sunlight in the morning is particularly effective; it leads to earlier melatonin onset in the evening and makes it easier to fall asleep.  Bright morning light has been shown to be effective against insomnia, premenstrual syndrome and seasonal affective disorder (SAD).

Effects on eyes 

Prolonged optical exposure to sunlight, especially intense ultraviolet light, may be linked to cortical cataracts, and high levels of visible light is maybe linked to macular degeneration.

However, significant daily exposure to bright light may be necessary for children to avoid myopia (nearsightedness).

Short-term over-exposure can cause snow blindness, which is analogous to sunburn of the cornea, or can cause solar retinopathy, which is long-lasting retinal damage and vision impairment from sungazing.

Frequent exposure to the sun can cause yellow non-cancerous bumps on the middle part of the sclera of the eye, called pingueculae. It is most common in younger people, mainly those who spend a lot of their time outdoors and do not protect their eyes from UV rays. To decrease the risk of developing pingueculae, it may be wise to wear sunglasses when outdoors, even on overcast days.

Folate degradation 

Blood levels of folate, a nutrient vital for fetal development, can be degraded by UV radiation, raising concerns about sun exposure for pregnant women. Lifespan and fertility can be adversely affected for individuals born during peaks of the 11-year solar cycle, possibly because of UV-related folate deficiency during gestation.

Safe level of sun exposure 

According to a 2007 study submitted by the University of Ottawa to the US Department of Health and Human Services, there is not enough information to determine a safe level of sun exposure that imposes minimal risk of skin cancer. In addition, there is not yet conclusive evidence on which components of ultraviolet radiation (UVA, UVB, UVC) are actually carcinogenic. UVC is almost completely absorbed by the atmosphere and does not reach the surface in any appreciable quantity.  As a result, only the broad-spectrum combination (UVA, UVB, UVC) known as "ultraviolet radiation" is listed as a carcinogen; the components are only "likely to become" known carcinogens.  Solar radiation (sunlight) and sunlamps are listed as carcinogens because they contain ultraviolet radiation.

Lifetime sun exposure 

There are currently no recommendations on a safe level of total lifetime sun exposure. According to epidemiologist Robyn Lucas at Australian National University, analysis of lifespan versus disease shows that far more lives worldwide could be lost to diseases caused by lack of sunlight than to those caused by too much, and it is inappropriate to recommend total avoidance of sunlight.

Over thousands of years, in many climate zones, genetic selection has helped indigenous human populations adapt toward skin pigmentation levels that provide a healthy level of UV exposure. This largely explains the tendency toward darker-skinned populations in the sunniest tropical environments, and lighter skin tones in less-sunny regions and for those who most need vitamin D for rapid bone growth, specifically children and reproductive-age women. The map to the right illustrates the geographic distribution of skin color for native populations prior to 1940, based on von Luschan's chromatic scale. These long-term adaptations for optimal health can be confounded by patterns of food, clothing and shelter, especially at a time when large populations have migrated far from the climates for which their skin was genetically adapted.

See also 
Fluorescent lamps and health
Heat stroke
Photosensitivity in humans
UV Index
High-energy visible light

References 

Sun
Sun tanning
Vitamin D